Lance Thomas Bade (born February 6, 1971 in Vancouver, Washington) is a target shooter and three-time Olympian.

Career

At the 1996 Summer Olympics, Bade competed in the trap and double trap.  In the trap, Bade won the bronze medal.  In the double trap, Bade finished in 10th place.

At the 2000 Summer Olympics, Bade finished in 16th place in the trap and 6th place in the double trap.

At the 2004 Summer Olympics, Bade finished in 5th place in the trap.

Records

References

 
 

1971 births
Living people
Sportspeople from Vancouver, Washington
American male sport shooters
United States Distinguished Marksman
Shooters at the 1996 Summer Olympics
Shooters at the 2000 Summer Olympics
Shooters at the 2004 Summer Olympics
Olympic bronze medalists for the United States in shooting
Trap and double trap shooters
Medalists at the 1996 Summer Olympics
Shooters at the 1999 Pan American Games
Pan American Games medalists in shooting
Pan American Games gold medalists for the United States
Pan American Games silver medalists for the United States
Medalists at the 1999 Pan American Games